HMS Bridgewater was a 32-gun fifth rate built at Sheerness Dockyard in 1697/98.

She was the second vessel to bear the name Bridgewater since it was used for a 58-gun ship built at Deptford in 1654, renamed Anne in May 1660 and blown up at Sheerness on 2 December 1673.

Construction and Specifications
She was ordered on 15 February 1697 to be built at Sheerness Dockyard under the guidance of Master Shipwright Robert Shortiss. She was launched on 30 May 1698. Her builder's measure tonnage was calculated as 411 tons (burthen).

The gun armament initially was four demi-culverins on the lower deck (LD) with two pair of guns per side. The upper deck (UD) battery would consist of between twenty and twenty-two 6-pounder guns with ten or eleven guns per side. The gun battery would be completed by four 4-pounder guns on the quarterdeck (QD) with two to three guns per side.

Commissioned Service 1699-1738
HMS Bridgewater was commissioned in 1699 under the command of Captain Thomas Dilkes for service in Irish Waters. In 1702 she was under Captain Richard Griffith followed by Captain Thomas Lawrence in October 1704. She remained in Irish waters. She was in action against two privateers off Kinsale, Ireland on 16 May 1705. Captain Walter Pigot was in command in 1707 still in Irish Waters, In 1711 she escorted a Russian convoy. She underwent a large repair at Chatham in 1712. Captain John Fletcher was in command in 1715 for service in the English Channel. She sailed to the Mediterranean and Sale, Morocco in 1717.

She was repaired at Woolwich at a cost of £2,251.10.8.5d between February and June 1718 then was placed in Ordinary. She was converted by Admiralty Order (AO) March 1727 to a 8-gun fireship with a crew of 55 personnel at Woolwich Dockyard in March/April 1727. She was recommissioned in 1727 under Captain John Temple for service with Sir Charles Wager's Fleet in the Baltic. She was fitted at Sheerness for £854.6.0d in June/July 1732. She was fitted at Sheerness for £415.14.1d in March/April 1734. She was commissioned un Commander Deorge Peacock (until 1737) for service with Sir John Norris's Fleet. She was repaired at Sheerness for £272.10.7d in December 1736 then assigned as guard ship at Sheerness.

Disposition
She was broken at Deptford Dockyard in April 1738.

Notes

Citations

References

 Winfield (2009), British Warships in the Age of Sail (1603 – 1714), by Rif Winfield, published by Seaforth Publishing, England © 2009, EPUB 
 Winfield (2007), British Warships in the Age of Sail (1714 – 1792), by Rif Winfield, published by Seaforth Publishing, England © 2007, EPUB 
 Colledge (2020), Ships of the Royal Navy, by J.J. Colledge, revised and updated by Lt Cdr Ben Warlow and Steve Bush, published by Seaforth Publishing, Barnsley, Great Britain, © 2020, EPUB 
 Lavery (1989), The Arming and Fitting of English Ships of War 1600 - 1815, by Brian Lavery, published by US Naval Institute Press © Brian Lavery 1989, Part V Guns, Type of Guns
 Clowes (1898), The Royal Navy, A History from the Earliest Times to the Present (Vol. II). London. England: Sampson Low, Marston & Company, © 1898
 Clowes (1898), The Royal Navy, A History from the Earliest Times to the Present (Vol. III). London. England: Sampson Low, Marston & Company, © 1898

 

Frigates of the Royal Navy
Ships of the Royal Navy
1690s ships